The Carlyle is a  tall skyscraper in Minneapolis, Minnesota, USA, located at 100 Third Avenue South. Completed in 2007, The Carlyle has 41 floors and 249 units. It is the 14th-tallest building in Minneapolis, and the 2nd tallest residential building in Minnesota.

It was designed by the Dallas architecture firm Humphreys and Partners Architects.

See also
List of tallest buildings in Minneapolis

References

Apartment buildings in Minnesota
Residential skyscrapers in Minneapolis
Buildings and structures completed in 2007